The Institute for Trafficked, Exploited, and Missing Persons (ITEMP) provides services to victims of forced labor, sexual exploitation, and other forms of modern-day slavery in Guatemala. Local authorities work with La Asociación Nuestros Ahijados in the rescue process, and rely on ITEMP to provide short- and long-term rehabilitation for rescued victims. ITEMP is unique in Guatemala, because the program works with adults as well as children. ITEMP fights trafficking and exploitation in three distinct ways: through rescue, rehabilitation, and public education. The project also focuses on prevention through public awareness and education, as well as by hosting the annual Guatemalan National Trafficking in Persons Congress.

Activities
ITEMP aggressively seeks custody of children being trafficked and/or exploited. The project also provides short- and long-term housing for all victims, through host families for minors, and shelter for adult victims. The rehabilitation process works to provide the tools for a better life. Counseling and education are made available for children, as well as technical and vocational training for adults. ITEMP also works to educate the people of Guatemala and the U.S. about trafficking and the terrible atrocities faced by exploited persons, and the resources available to help those who need it.

Goals
Victims of trafficking and exploitation are coerced through fear tactics, violence, and a lack of knowledge of the resources available to them. Rescue is only the first step. The goals of ITEMP are: protection, prevention, and, on a smaller scale, prosecution. Many of those rescued are at a very high risk of falling victim to trafficking or exploitation again. Long-term rehabilitation, including education and counseling, provides tools to resist being victimized in the future and requires significant funding to ensure its success. ITEMP and Nuestros Ahijados are dedicated to the complete rehabilitation of rescued persons regardless of the amount of time it takes. Children that enter the program at the age of six or seven will be taken through the program until the completion of their education, sometimes all the way through medical or law school. Such long-term commitment is rarely available and makes ITEMP an essential asset to the people it serves.

Community cooperation
While assisting victims is crucial, long-term solutions include educating the general public. Community cooperation is essential in the battle against modern slavery. ITEMP is currently coordinating an agreement between local hotels to refuse the rental of rooms to minors, or persons other than family members wishing to rent rooms with minors. Stories like Ana's (see below) are all too common, and must not be tolerated.

Awareness on the part of the public creates intolerance of such atrocities being committed to those who can't, or don't know how to, defend themselves against exploitation. Many victims are unwilling to cooperate with authorities to prosecute traffickers because they still believe they are in danger, or do not wish to relive the terrible acts they've survived. ITEMP provides counseling and legal services to work with victims in the hopes of increasing prosecution of traffickers in Guatemala. ITEMP recognizes that trafficking in persons is a complex problem that requires multiple acts of intervention to eradicate exploitation of, and trafficking in persons.

ITEMP works with other programs/NGOs, as well as the Guatemalan government to better aid victims and increase prosecution of offenders. In 2008, the project hosted the first annual Guatemalan National Trafficking in Persons Congress

References

Human rights organizations based in Guatemala